Burgos Club de Fútbol was a Spanish football club based in Burgos, in the autonomous community of Castile and León. Founded in 1936, it managed six seasons in the first division, mainly in the late 1970s. 

Due to serious economic debts, it disappeared in 1983. Two years later, José María Quintano, a local entrepreneur, decided to refound the club with the same name, and in 1994, it started competing again in the regional leagues, completely independent from its predecessor.

Season to season

6 seasons in La Liga
17 seasons in Segunda División
1 season in Segunda División B
16 seasons in Tercera División (third tier)

Famous players
 Sergije Krešić
 Ilija Katić
 Juanito
 Miguel Ángel Portugal

Famous coaches
 Marcel Domingo
 Lucien Muller

Burgos CF (1936)
Defunct football clubs in Castile and León
Sport in Burgos
Association football clubs established in 1936
Association football clubs disestablished in 1983
1936 establishments in Spain
1983 disestablishments in Spain
Segunda División clubs
La Liga clubs